Durianluncuk is a village in the Batang Hari Regency in the Jambi Province of Sumatra, Indonesia.

Nearby towns and villages include Jernih-tua (18.0 nm), Padangkelapa (13.9 nm), Matagoal (4.5 nm), Jangga (6.0 nm), Gurun-tua (10.8 nm), Muaraketalo (4.0 nm).

References

External links
Satellite map at Maplandia.com

Populated places in Jambi